"Patterns" is a song written by Paul Simon and included on his 1965 album The Paul Simon Songbook, and later recorded by Simon and Garfunkel on their third album, Parsley, Sage, Rosemary and Thyme.  The lyrics are about how life is a labyrinthine maze, following patterns which are, because we are trapped in them, difficult to unravel or control.

Warrel Dane included a heavy metal cover of the song on his 2008 album Praises to the War Machine.

References 
 [ Review of Patterns] on allmusic.com

1965 songs
Simon & Garfunkel songs
Songs written by Paul Simon
Song recordings produced by Bob Johnston